Events in the year 1900 in India.

Incumbents
 Empress of India – Queen Victoria
 Viceroy of India – George Curzon, 1st Marquess Curzon of Kedleston

Events
 National income - 7,080 million
 India's first participation in the summer Olympics

Law
Prisoners Act

Births
12 July – Chhabi Biswas, actor (died 1962).
2 October – Mahendra Lal Wadhwa, freedom fighter (died 1988).
29 December – Deenanath Mangeshkar, actor, musician and singer (died 1942).

Deaths
Kavi Kalapi, poet (born 1874).

References

 
India
Years of the 19th century in India